Dorcadion grande is a species of beetle belonging to the family Cerambycidae. It was described by Jakovlev in 1906. It is found in Kazakhstan.

See also 
 Dorcadion

References

grande
Beetles described in 1906